Juan José Collantes Guerrero (born 7 January 1983) is a Spanish former professional footballer who played as a right winger.

A Segunda División veteran, he played 275 matches in the competition while scoring 38 goals at the service of six clubs.

Club career
Born in San Fernando, Cádiz, Andalusia, Collantes was a Villarreal CF youth graduate and made his senior debut with farm team CD Onda in the 2001–02 season, in Segunda División B. He competed at that level the following six years, representing Palamós CF, Racing de Santander B and Rayo Vallecano, achieving promotion to Segunda División with the latter in 2008 while scoring a career-best 12 goals.

Collantes made his professional debut on 30 August 2008, playing the last 25 minutes of the 1–0 home win against Real Murcia after coming on for Míchel. He scored his first goal on 25 October, netting his team's last in a 4–1 rout of SD Eibar also at Campo de Fútbol de Vallecas.

In January 2010, after being rarely used during the campaign, Collantes joined division three side Granada CF, and was a regular starter in their two consecutive promotions. He would remain in that tier the following years, playing for FC Cartagena, CE Sabadell FC, AD Alcorcón and UCAM Murcia CF while suffering three relegations.

On 11 July 2017, Collantes agreed to a contract with Elche CF of the third division. After contributing regularly to the club's immediate promotion, he was deemed surplus to requirements by manager Pacheta and returned to UCAM on 31 August 2018.

Collantes joined Tercera División's CD Roda on 6 December 2019.

References

External links

1983 births
Living people
People from San Fernando, Cádiz
Sportspeople from the Province of Cádiz
Spanish footballers
Footballers from Andalusia
Association football wingers
Segunda División players
Segunda División B players
Tercera División players
Palamós CF footballers
Rayo Cantabria players
Racing de Santander players
Rayo Vallecano players
Granada CF footballers
FC Cartagena footballers
CE Sabadell FC footballers
AD Alcorcón footballers
UCAM Murcia CF players
Elche CF players